Cristina Guzmán is a Mexican telenovela produced by Ernesto Alonso for Telesistema Mexicano in 1966.

Cast 
Amparo Rivelles as Cristina Guzmán/Claudia 
Enrique Rocha
Aarón Hernán
Teresa Grobois
Ariadna Welter
Ernesto Alonso as Gabriel
Antonio Bravo
Fedora Capdevila
Fanny Schiller
Jorge Mondragón
Rosa Furman
Carlos Fernández
Alberto Zayas
Luis Gimeno

Remakes
Los ricos también lloran (1979-1980)
María la del Barrio (1995-1996)
Marina (2006)

References

External links 

Mexican telenovelas
1966 telenovelas
Televisa telenovelas
Spanish-language telenovelas
1966 Mexican television series debuts
1966 Mexican television series endings